is a former Japanese football player and manager. He played for Japan national team.

Club career
Nomura was born in Muroran on November 21, 1956. After graduating from Sapporo University, he joined Fujita Industries in 1979. In 1979, the club won Japan Soccer League and Emperor's Cup. In 1981, the club also won Japan Soccer League and he was selected Best Eleven. He retired in 1989. He played 150 games and scored 4 goals in the league.

National team career
On June 2, 1981, Nomura debuted for Japan national team against China. After debut, he played all matches until July 1982. He played 12 games for Japan until 1982.

Coaching career
In 2007, Nomura signed with L.League Division 2 club TEPCO Mareeze. He led the club to won the champions and promoted to Division 1. He resigned end of 2008 season.

National team statistics

References

External links

Japan National Football Team Database

1956 births
Living people
Sapporo University alumni
Association football people from Hokkaido
Japanese footballers
Japan international footballers
Japan Soccer League players
Shonan Bellmare players
Japanese football managers
Association football defenders
People from Muroran, Hokkaido